Canoeing and Kayaking were held at the 2002 Asian Games in Busan, South Korea from October 10 to October 12. Men's and women's competition were held in Kayak and men's competition in Canoe with all events having taken place at the Nakdong River Rowing and Canoeing Courses. The competition included only sprint events.

Schedule

Medalists

Men

Women

Medal table

Participating nations
A total of 107 athletes from 14 nations competed in canoeing at the 2002 Asian Games:

References 

2002 Asian Games Official Reports, Pages 344–356
 Results

External links 
Official Website

 
2002 Asian Games events
2002
Asian Games
2002 Asian Games